The Sultan Idris Shah II Mosque is the state mosque of Perak, Malaysia. It is situated in Ipoh, Perak's capital city, near the Birch Memorial.

History
The construction of the mosque began in May 1966 and was completed in August 1968. The mosque was officially opened in September 1978 by Sultan Idris Shah II of Perak in conjunction with his 54th birthday celebration.

Transportation
The mosque is accessible within walking distance east of Ipoh Station of KTM.

See also
 Islam in Malaysia
Mosques in Malaysia

References

1968 establishments in Malaysia
Mosques in Perak
Buildings and structures in Ipoh
Mosques completed in 1968
Mosque buildings with domes